The Independent Professional Wrestling Alliance was a professional wrestling promotion based in Alexandria, Virginia from 1995 to 2001. Former employees in the IPWA consisted of professional wrestlers, managers, play-by-play and color commentators, announcers, interviewers and referees.

Alumni

Male wrestlers

Female wrestlers

Midget wrestlers

Stables and tag teams

Managers and valets

Commentators and interviewers

Referees

Other personnel

References
General

Specific

External links

Independent Professional Wrestling Alliance alumni at Wrestlingdata.com

Independent Professional Wrestling Alliance alumni